A tawaif was a highly successful entertainer who catered to the nobility of the Indian subcontinent, particularly during the Mughal era. The tawaifs excelled in and contributed to music, dance (mujra), theatre, and the Urdu literary tradition, and were considered an authority on etiquette. Tawaifs were largely a North Indian institution central to Mughal court culture from the 16th century onwards and became even more prominent with the weakening of Mughal rule in the mid-18th century. They contributed significantly to the continuation of traditional dance and music forms and then to the emergence of modern Indian cinema.

History
Tawaifs have existed for centuries in the Indian Subcontinent, including the famous Vasantasena in fifth century BC. The patronage of the Mughal court before and after the Mughal Dynasty in the Doab region and the artistic atmosphere of 16th century Lucknow made arts-related careers a viable prospect. Many girls were taken at a young age and trained in both performing arts (such as Kathak and Hindustani classical music) as well as literature (ghazal, thumri) to high standards. Once they had matured and possessed a sufficient command over dancing and singing, they became a tawaif, high-class courtesans who served the rich and noble.

The tawaif's introduction into her profession was marked by a celebration, the so-called missī ceremony, that customarily included the inaugural blackening of her teeth.

It is also believed that young nawabs-to-be were sent to these "tawaifs" to learn "tameez" and "tehzeeb" which included the ability to differentiate and appreciate good music and literature, perhaps even practice it, especially the art of ghazal writing. By the 18th century, they had become the central element of polite, refined culture in North India.

The tawaifs would dance, sing (especially ghazals), recite poetry (shairi) and entertain their suitors at mehfils. Like the geisha tradition in Japan, their main purpose was to professionally entertain their guests, and while sex was often incidental, it was not assured contractually. High-class or the most popular tawaifs could often pick and choose among the best of their suitors.

Some of the popular tawaifs were Begum Samru (who rose to rule the principality of Sardhana in western Uttar Pradesh), Moran Sarkar (who became the wife of Maharaja Ranjit Singh), Wazeeran (patronised by Lucknow's last nawab Wajid Ali Shah), Begum Hazrat Mahal (Wajid Ali's first wife who played an important role in the Indian Rebellion), Gauhar Jaan (a notable classical singer who sang for India's first-ever record), and Zohrabai Agrewali. A number of television and film actresses from Pakistan were tawaifs, including Niggo, Nadira (Pakistani actress), and Naina.

Decline

The annexation of Oudh by the East India Company in 1856 sounded the first death-knell for this medieval-era institution. It was soon looked upon with disfavour by the colonial government, and the tawaif were eventually forced to go into prostitution due to a lack of employment opportunities. Social reformers in India opposed them as social decadence. The institutions survived until India's independence in 1947. Some of the famous tawaifs include:

 Malka Jaan, and daughter Gauhar Jaan (1873–1930) who created the very first Indian song recording in 1902.
 Jaddanbai (1892–1949) – a master music composer, singer, actress, and film maker.  
 Binodini Dasi (1862–1941)
 Rasoolan Bai (1902 – 15 December 1974) 
 Roshan Ara Begum (1917 – 6 December 1982)  Sitara-e-Imtiaz
 Zareena Begum of Lucknow (1947 – 12 May 2018)
 Gangubai Kothewali (1939-2008)

They used to be the only source of popular music and dance and were often invited to perform on weddings and other occasions. Some of them became concubines and wives of maharajas and wealthy individuals. They were the first singers to record on gramophone with the emergence of that new technology. With the emergence of movies, however, they lost popularity.

Popular culture

In Films

The image of the tawaif has had an enduring appeal, immortalized in Bollywood movies and Pakistani dramas.
Films with a tawaif as a character include
Devdas (1955)
Pyaasa (1957)
Sadhna (1958)
Zindagi Ya Toofan (1958)
Sahib Bibi Aur Ghulam (1962)
Sharafat (1970)
Anjuman (1970)
Pakeezah (1972)
Umrao Jaan Ada (film) (1972)
Gomti Ke Kinare (1972)
Amar Prem (1972)
Muqaddar Ka Sikandar (1978)
Karmayogi (1978)
Kasme Vaade (1978)
Suhaag (1979)
Umrao Jaan (1981)
Daasi (1981)
Prem Tapasya (1983)
Utsav (1984)
Maati Maangey Khoon (1984)
Tawaif (1985)
Angaaray (1986)
Inteqam (1988)
Pati Patni Aur Tawaif (1990)
Dil Aashna Hai (1992) 
Devdas (2002)
Mahnoor (2004)
Chameli (2004)
Mangal Pandey: The Rising (2005)
Umrao Jaan (2006) 
Laaga Chunari Mein Daag (2007)
Saawariya (2007)
Kajraare (2010)
Bol (2011)
Bazaar E Husn (2014)
Barkhaa (2015)
 Mah e Mir (2016)
Kalank (2019)
Gangubai Kathiawadi (2022)
The Black Woman (Depicts a tawaif in a supporting role, often in situations where a man in a loveless marriage goes to her.)

In Indian Drama Series

Lajwanti (TV series)

In Documentary films

The Other Song (2009)

In Pakistani dramas

Chand Grehan (1991), drama on STN
Red Card (1994), drama on STN
Samandar Hai Darmiyan (1998)
Ghulam Gardish
Adhoray Khawab
Chand Chehra
Mere Humnasheen, a television film
Saza Aur Jaza (2002), PTV drama
Umrao Jaan Ada (TV series) (2003)
Aatish (2004), PTV drama
Meharun Nisa (2004)
Kaantay (2004), PTV drama
Bheegi Palkain (2005)
Makan Aka Home a Heaven (2006)
Bhool, PTV drama
Sitam (2006), PTV drama
Bazar (2006), PTV telefilm based on story by Saadat Hasan Manto
Jhumka Jaan (2007)
Sanjha (2011)
Meri Behan Maya (2011)
Anjuman, a television film (2013)
Mein Sitara (2016)
Alif Allah Aur Insaan (2017)
Alif (2019)
Deewar-e-Shab (2019)
Raqs e Bismil (2020)
Khuda Aur Mohabbat (season 3) (2021)
Badzaat (2022)

In Literature

Tawaifnama by Saba Dewan
TABOO: The Hidden Culture of a Red Light District by Fouzia Saeed
Umrao Jaan Ada novel by Mirza Hadi Ruswa
Bazaar-e-Husn novel by Munshi Premchand
Bazar story by Saadat Hasan Manto

See also

 Similar professions in other cultures
 Almah, a similar profession in the Middle East
 Ca trù, a similar profession in Vietnam
 Geisha, a similar profession in Japan
 Kisaeng, a similar profession in Korea
 Oiran, a similar profession in ancient Japan
 Nagarvadhu, a similar profession in ancient India
 Shamakhi dancers, a similar profession in Azerbaijan
 Yiji, a similar profession in China
 Similar topics in India
 Bargirl
 Dance bar
 Mujra
 Nautch
 Devdasi
 Related topics
 Prostitution in colonial India 
 Prostitution in India

References

Further reading
 Martha Feldman, Bonnie Gordon. The courtesan's arts: cross-cultural perspectives. pp. 312–352.
 Essay on Asia art, history, epigraphy and culture in Honour of Gouriswar Bhattacharya

External links 
The Tawaif, The Anti – Nautch Movement, and the Development of North Indian Classical Music

Obsolete occupations
Sex industry in India
Courtesans by type
Culture of Lucknow
Culture of Uttar Pradesh